Phạm Ngũ Lão was a leading general of the Trần Dynasty.

Phạm Ngũ Lão may also refer to:
 Phạm Ngũ Lão Street, a street in Ho Chi Minh City, Vietnam
 , a frigate in commission in the Republic of Vietnam Navy from 1972 to 1975
 , a patrol vessel in commission in the Vietnamese People's Navy in 1975